Notre Dame Bay is a large bay in Newfoundland, Canada. To the south it adjoins the Bay of Exploits.

The name, French for Our Lady Bay, dates to at least 1550, and is possibly a French translation of an earlier Portuguese name.

Trump Islands are located within Notre Dame Bay.

References

Bays of Newfoundland and Labrador